Poland competed at the 2017 World Aquatics Championships in Budapest, Hungary from 14 July to 30 July.

Medalists

Diving

Poland has entered 3 divers (two male and one female).

Men

Women

High diving

Poland qualified one male high diver.

Open water swimming

Poland has entered two open water swimmers

Swimming

Polish swimmers have achieved qualifying standards in the following events (up to a maximum of 2 swimmers in each event at the A-standard entry time, and 1 at the B-standard):

Men

Women

Synchronized swimming

Poland's synchronized swimming team consisted of 2 athletes (2 female).

Women

References

Nations at the 2017 World Aquatics Championships
Poland at the World Aquatics Championships
2017 in Polish sport